This article uses Logar transcription.

The Karst dialect, sometimes called the Gorizia–Karst dialect, is a Slovene dialect spoken on the northern Karst Plateau, in the central Slovene Littoral, and in parts of the Italian provinces of Trieste and Gorizia. The dialect borders the Inner Carniolan dialect to the south, the Cerkno dialect to the east, the Tolmin dialect to the northeast, the Soča dialect to the north, the Natisone Valley and Brda dialects to the northwest, and Venetian and Friulian to the west. The dialect belongs to the Littoral dialect group, and it evolved from the Venetian–Karst dialect base.

Geographic distribution 
The name of the dialect is somewhat misleading because its use is not limited to the Karst Plateau, nor does it encompass the entire Karst Plateau. It is spoken only in the northwestern parts of the Karst Plateau, in a line from the villages of Prosecco and Contovello near Trieste, west of Sgonico, Dutovlje, Štanjel, and Dobravlje. East of that line, the Inner Carniolan dialect is spoken. In addition to the northwestern part of the Karst Plateau, the dialect is spoken in the lower Vipava Valley (west of Črniče), in the lower Soča Valley (south of Ročinj and up to Manizza), and on the Banjšice Plateau and the Trnovo Forest Plateau. 

It thus encompasses most of the territory of the Municipality of Kanal ob Soči, and the entire territory of the municipalities of Nova Gorica, Renče-Vogrsko, Šempeter-Vrtojba, Miren-Kostanjevica, and Komen, as well as some villages in the western part of the Municipality of Sežana. It is also spoken in the southern suburbs of the Italian town of Gorizia (most notably in the suburb of Sant'Andrea), and in the municipalities of Savogna d'Isonzo, Doberdò del Lago, and Duino-Aurisina. It is also spoken in some northwestern suburbs of Trieste, especially in Barcola, Prosecco, and Contovello.

Notable settlements include Prosecco, Santa Croce, Aurisina, Sistiana, Duino, Savogna, Lucinico, and Gorizia in Italy, as well as Komen, Branik, Dornberk, Prvačina, Renče, Vogrsko, Miren, Bilje, Bukovica, Volčja Draga, Šempeter, Vrtojba, Šempas, Vitovlje, Ozeljan, Nova Gorica, Solkan, Grgar, Deskle, Anhovo, and Kanal ob Soči in Slovenia.

Some 60,000 to 70,000 Slovene speakers live in the territory where the dialect is spoken, most of whom have some level of knowledge of the dialect.

Accentual changes 
The Karst dialect has lost pitch accent, as well as the distinction between long and short vowels. It has also undergone four accent shifts:  → ,  → ,  → , and  → . The Banjšice subdialect still distinguishes between long and short vowels and has not undergone the  →  shift.

Phonology 
The vowel *ū evolved into uː. Long  turned into , and around Solkan back into .

Palatal consonants are still palatal, except that  turned into , rarely also into , and  might have depalatalized. The consonant  turned into . Velar  still exists.

The Banjšice subdialect is more archaic; diphthongs are more prominent,  turned into , and  mostly turned into , although  and  also exist. The vowel  mostly turned into , but it is still  in the south. Palatal  turned into  in Avče.

Morphology 
Neuter gender exists in the singular, but it has been feminized in the plural. The dual has mostly been lost, except in the east, where there are some remnants. All verbs have an  infix in the second- and third-person plural. The long infinitive has been replaced by the short infinitive, and o-stem nouns have the ending  in the dative and locative singular.

Subdivision 

The Karst dialect has a more archaic subdialect, the Banjšice subdialect, in the northern part, which still has length oppositions in stressed syllables and has not undergone the  →  accent shift. Northern microdialects (particularly the Avče microdialect) show the influence of the Tolmin dialect.

References

Bibliography 

 
 

Slovene dialects